The South Africa women's national rugby union team represents South Africa in women's international rugby union and is governed by the South African Rugby Union. They have appeared in three World Cups since their debut in the 2006 Women's Rugby World Cup.

History
The Springbok Women played their first Test in 2004. They have won the Rugby Africa Women's Cup twice — in 2019 and 2022. South Africa climbed to eleventh place on the World Rugby ranking in September 2022 with wins over Japan and Spain.

Players

Recent squad 
South Africa named their final 32-player squad on the 21 September 2022, for the 2021 Rugby World Cup.

Team Management

Results
For the full list of all Springbok Women matches:

World Ranking
Rugby World Ranking per year end

World Cup results

Results summary

See also

Players
Lerato Makua
Zintle Mpupha
Simamkele Namba
Nadine Roos
Snenhlanhla Shozi
Sizophila Solontsi
Nomsebenzi Tsotsobe
Eloise Webb
Mandisa Williams

References

External links

Women's national team at SA Rugby official website

Women's national rugby union teams
African national women's rugby union teams
Women